Heftye Island is a small island which is the southernmost of the Possession Islands, lying east of the south end of Adare Peninsula, Antarctica. It was named by a Norwegian expedition of 1894–95, led by Henrik Johan Bull and Leonard Kristensen, for Messrs. Thos. Joh. Heftye & Søn of Christiania (now Oslo), shareholders in the expedition ship Antarctic.

See also 
 List of antarctic and sub-antarctic islands

References

Islands of Victoria Land
Borchgrevink Coast